Tauchlitz is a village within the municipality of Crossen an der Elster in Saale-Holzland-Kreis in Thuringia.

Geography 
Tauchlitz lies east of Crossen an der Elster and even east of the river Elster in the floodplain. The place is connected to the main road. 7 In the valley the railway Saalfeld / Saale-Gera-Leipzig leads past the Elster stopping in Crossen.

History 
On September 20, 1271 the documentary dated document has been archived. The place was and is dominated by agriculture.

References 

Wolfgang Kahl: Ersterwähnung Thüringer Städte und Dörfer. Ein Handbuch.Verlag Rockstuhl, Bad Langensalza, 2010, S. 281

Saale-Holzland-Kreis